Kenneth Duncan Brownlee (1934 – 12 September 2022) was a Scottish professional footballer who played as a left-half for Aberdeen, Third Lanark and St Johnstone 

Brownlee was born in Dalkeith in 1934. He died on 12 September 2022, at the age of 87 in South Africa, due to heart failure.

References

External links
AFC Heritage profile

1934 births
2022 deaths
Scottish footballers
Association football wing halves
Scottish Football League players
Aberdeen F.C. players
Third Lanark A.C. players
St Johnstone F.C. players
Caledonian F.C. players
Huntly F.C. players
Peterhead F.C. players
Hellenic F.C. players